Harhaj is a village and municipality in Bardejov District in the Prešov Region of north-east Slovakia.

History
In historical records the village was first mentioned in 1426.

Geography
The municipality lies at an altitude of 200 metres and covers an area of 4.434 km².
It has a population of about 245 people.

Genealogical resources

The records for genealogical research are available at the state archive "Statny Archiv in Presov, Slovakia"

 Roman Catholic church records (births/marriages/deaths): 1788-1895 (parish B)
 Greek Catholic church records (births/marriages/deaths): 1817-1939 (parish B)

See also
 List of municipalities and towns in Slovakia

References

External links
 
Surnames of living people in Harhaj

Villages and municipalities in Bardejov District
Šariš